The Czech and Slovak Federative Republic (informally known as Czechoslovakia) competed as a nation for the last time at the 1992 Summer Olympics in Barcelona, Spain.  After the dissolution of Czechoslovakia at the end of 1992, the Czech Republic and Slovakia would compete as independent nations at the 1996 Summer Olympics. 208 competitors, 146 men and 62 women, took part in 121 events in 25 sports.

Medalists

Competitors
The following is the list of number of competitors in the Games.

Archery

Czechoslovakia's second archery appearance came twelve years after its first.  Only one man competed for Czechoslovakia, not advancing to the elimination rounds.

Men's Individual Competition:
 Martin Hámor – Ranking round (did not advance – 65th place)

Athletics

Men's 110m Hurdles
 Igor Kováč 
 Heat — 14.12s (→ did not advance)

Men's 400m Hurdles
 Jozef Kucej
 Heat — 50.28s (→ did not advance)

Men's Marathon
 Karel David — 2:16:34 (→ 19th place)

Men's Long Jump
 Milan Gombala
 Heat — 7.69 m (→ did not advance)

Men's Triple Jump
 Milan Mikuláš
 Heat — 16.82 m (→ did not advance)

Men's Discus Throw
 Imrich Bugár 
 Heat — 58.70 m (→ did not advance)

Men's Javelin Throw
Jan Železný 
Final — 89.66m (→ Gold Medal)

Men's Hammer Throw
 Pavel Sedláček
 Heat — 67.76 m (→ did not advance)

Men's 20 km Walk
 Pavol Blažek – 1:29:23 (→ 17th place)
 Igor Kollár – 1:29:38 (→ 19th place)
 Jan Záhončík – 1:33:37 (→ 28th place)

Men's 50 km Walk
 Roman Mrázek – 3:55:21 (→ 5th place)
 Pavol Szikora – 4:17:49 (→ 27th place)
 Pavol Blažek – 4:22:33 (→ 29th place)

Men's Decathlon
 Robert Změlík — 8.611 points (→ Gold Medal)

Women's Marathon
 Alena Peterková – 2:53:30 (→ 25th place)

Women's High Jump
 Šárka Kašpárková
 Heat — 1.88m (→ did not advance)
 Šárka Nováková
 Heat — 1.83m (→ did not advance)

Women's Discus Throw
 Vladimíra Malátová
 Heat — 59.04m (→ did not advance)

Badminton

Men
 Tomasz mendrek – Round of 32 (lost to Foo Kok Keong MAS 0-2)

Women
 Eva Lacinová – Round of 64 (lost to Doris Piche CAN 0-2)

Basketball

Women's Team Competition
Preliminary round (group B)
 Lost to United States (55-111)
 Lost to Spain (58-59)
 Lost to China (70-72)
Classification Matches
5th-8th place: Defeated Brazil (74-62)
5th-6th place: Lost to Spain (58-59) → Sixth place
Team Roster
Iveta Bielikova
Martina Luptakova
Ana Janostinova   
Eva Nemcova   
Ana Chupikova  
Eva Antalecova    
Renata Hirakova
Adriana Chamajova   
Erika Burianova   
Kamila Vodickova  
Milena Razgova  
Eva Berkova

Boxing

Flyweight (51 kg)
 Stanislav Vagaský – Round of 32 (lost to Isidrio Visvera PHI)

Middleweight (75 kg)
 Michal franek – Round of 32 (lost to Lee Seung-Bae KOR)

Heavyweight (91 kg)
 Vojtěch Rückschloss – Quarterfinals (lost to David Tua NZL rsc – 5th place)

Super Heavyweight (+91 kg)
 Peter Hrivňák – Quarterfinals (lost to Brian Nielsen DEN 4-14 – 5th place)

Canoeing

Flatwater 
K1 – 500 m men
 Attila Szabó – semifinal (did not advance)

K2 – 500 m men
 Juraj Kadnár, Róbert Erban – semifinal (did not advance)

C1 – 500 m men
 Slavomír Kňazovický – final: 1:54.51 (4th place)

C2 – 500 m men
 Jan Bartůněk, Waldemar Fibigr – final: 1:44.70 (8th place)

K1 – 1000 m men
 Róbert Erban – semifinal (did not advance)

K2 – 1000 m men
 René Kučera, Petr Hruška – final: 3:23.12 (7th place)

K4 – 1000 m men
 Jozef Turza, Juraj Kadnár, Róbert Erban, Attila Szabó – final: 2:57.06 (4th place)

C1 – 1000 m men
 Jan Bartůněk – final: 4:15,25 (8th place)

C2 – 1000 m men
 Jan Bartůněk, Waldemar Fibigr – final: 1:44,70 (8th place)

K2 – 500 m women
 Jobánková, Janáčková – semifinal (did not advance)

K4 – 500 m women
 Jobánková, Janáčková, Havelková, Vokurková – semifinal (did not advance)

Water slalom
K1 men
 Luboš Hilgert – 116.63 (23rd place)
 Pavel Prindiš – 117.60 (24th place)

C1 men
  Lukáš Pollert – 113.69 (gold medal) 
 Jakub Prüher – 151.85 (26th place)

C2 men
  Miroslav Šimek, Jiří Rohan – 124.25 (silver medal) 
 Petr Štercl, Pavel Štercl – 130.42 (6th place)
 Jan Petříček, Tomáš Petříček – 131.86 (7th place)

K1 women
 Zdenka Grossmannová – 135.79 (5th place)
 Štěpánka Hilgertová – 141.43 (12th place)
 Marcela Sadilová – 150.38 (20th place)

Cycling

Twelve cyclists, all men, represented Czechoslovakia in 1992.

Road cycling
Men's road race
 František Trkal – 25th place
 Miloslav Kejval – 27th place
 Pavel Padrnos – 69th place

Men's team time trial
 Czechoslovakia – 2:06:44 (8th place)
 Jaroslav Bílek
 Miroslav Lipták
 Pavel Padrnos
 František Trkal

Track cycling
Men's sprint
 Jaroslav Jeřábek – 13th place

Men's individual pursuit
 Michal Baldrián – 14th place

Men's team pursuit
 Czechoslovakia – 8th place
 Jan Panáček
 Pavel Tesař
 Rudolf Juřícký
 Svatopluk Buchta

Men's points race
 Lubor Tesař – 5th place

Diving

Women's 3m Springboard
Heidemarie Bártová
 Preliminary Round — 286.14 points 
Final — 491.49 points (→ 4th place)

Equestrianism

Showjumping
 Jiří Pecháček, Garta – withdrew due to horse's illness in qualification round

Fencing

Five male fencers represented Czechoslovakia in 1992.

Men's épée
 Aleš Depta – 16th place
 Jiří Douba – 21st place
 Roman Ječmínek – 35th place

Men's team épée
 Czechoslovakia – preliminary group: 2 losses (did not advance, 9th place)
 Aleš Depta
 Jiří Douba
 Roman Ječmínek
 Michal Franc
 Tomáš Kubíček

Gymnastics

Two men and three Czechoslovak women participated in the artistic gymnastics competition, but only Pavla Kinclová managed to advance to the all-around finals in comparison to three finalists in 1988, where Czechoslovakia entered whole women's team. Daniela Bártová later switched to athletics and participated in the 2000 Olympics in pole vault. Lenka Oulehlová recorded second of her three Olympic participations with her (and Czechoslovakia's all-time rhythmic gymnastics) best Olympics result - 8th place.

Artistic Gymnastics
Men
 Martin modlitba – qualification all-around: 112.625 points (62nd place)
 Arnold Bugár – qualification all-around: 111.200 points (77th place)

Women
 Pavla Kinclová – final all-around: 38.899 points (24th place)
 Iveta Poloková – qualification all-around: 76.773 points (58th place)
 Daniela Bártová – qualification all-around: 76.535 points (64th place)

Rhythmic Gymnastics

Individual
 Lenka Oulehlová – final: 56.137 points (8th place)
 Jana Šrámková – qualification: 27.650 points (16th place)

Handball

Men's Team Competition
Preliminary round (group A)
 Czechoslovakia – Sweden 14-20
 Czechoslovakia – Iceland 16-16
 Czechoslovakia – South Korea 19-20
 Czechoslovakia – Brazil 27-16
 Czechoslovakia – Hungary 18-20
Classification Match
 9th/10th place: Czechoslovakia – Germany 20-19 (→ Ninth place)
Team Roster
Petr Baumruk
Roman Bečvář
Zoltán Bergendi
Milan Folta
Petr Házl
Ľuboš Hudák
Peter Kakaščík
Peter Kalafut
Václav Lanča
Peter Mesiarik
Bohumír Prokop
Ján Sedláček
Martin Šetlík
Ľubomír Švajlen
Michal Tonar
Zdeněk Vaněk
Head coach: František Šulc

Judo

60 kg men
 Petr Šedivák – 1st round (lost to Junior BRA)

65 kg men
 Pavel Petřikov – 3rd round (lost to Csak HUN), repechage 1st round (lost to Laats BEL)

71 kg men
 Josef Věnsek – 3rd round (lost to Korhoren FIN)

95 kg men
 Jiří Sosna – 2nd round (lost to Aurelio BRA)

61 kg women
 Miroslava Jánošíková – 3rd round (lost to Arad ISR), repechage 1st round (lost to Martin ESP)

Modern pentathlon

Three male pentathletes represented Czechoslovakia in 1992.

Men
 Petr Blažek – 5.239 points (14th place)
 Tomáš Fleissner – 5.128 points (29th place)
 Jiří Prokopius – 4.635 points (57th place)

Men – teams
 Czechoslovakia – 15.002 points (9th place)
 Petr Blažek
 Tomáš Fleissner
 Jiří Prokopius

Rowing

Single sculls men
  Václav Chalupa – final: 6:52.93 (silver medal) 

Coxed pairs men
 Czechoslovakia – withdrew
 Michal Dalecký, Dušan Macháček, cox Oldřich Hejdušek

Coxed fours men
 Czechoslovakia – 10th place
 Petr Batěk, Martin Parkán, Martin Tomaštík, Ivo Žerava, cox Martin Svoboda

Eights men
 Czechoslovakia – 12th place
 Radek Zavadil, Pavel Sokol, Petr Blecha, Jan Beneš, Pavel Menšík, Ondřej Holeček, Jiří Šefčík, Dušan Businský, cox Jiří Pták

Paired fours women
 Czechoslovakia – final: 6:35,99 (6th place)
 Irena Soukupová, Michaela Burešová, Hana Kafková, Lubica Novotníková

Eights women
 Czechoslovakia – 8th place
 Hana Žáková, Hana Dariusová, Renata Beránková, Martina Šefčíková, Sabina Telenská, Radka Zavadilová, Michaela Vávrová, Eliška Jandová, (cox) Lenka Kováčová

Sailing

Men's Sailboard (Lechner A-390)
Patrik Hrdina
 Final Ranking — 239.0 points (→ 25th place)

Women's 470 Class
Renata Srbová and Radmila Dobnerová
 Final Ranking — 112 points (→ 16th place)

Shooting

Air rifle men
 Petr Kůrka – 588 points (13th place)
 Dalimil nejezchleba – 586 points (21st place)

Free pistol men
 Stanislav jirkal – 553 points (17th place)

Air pistol men
 Stanislav jirkal – 580 points (10th place)

Rapid fire pistol men
 Jindřich Skupa – 584 points (13th place)

Rifle prone men
 Milan Bakeš – 591 points (31st place)
 Miroslav Varga – 591 points (31st place)

Rifle 3x40 men
 Petr Kůrka – 1162 points (11th place)
 Milan Bakeš – 1155 points (21st place)

Skeet men
 Luboš Adamec – 197 points (11th place)
 Leoš Hlaváček – 196 points (16th place)
 David valter – 195 points (21st place)

Trap men
  Petr Hrdlička – 219 points (gold medal) 
 Pavel kubec – 218 points (5th place)

Running target
  Luboš Račanský – 670 points (bronze medal) 
 Miroslav Januš – 572 points (9th place)

Air rifle women
 Dagmar Bílková – 494.9 points (4th place)
 Lenka Koloušková – 586 points (17th place)

Standard rifle 3x20 women
 Lenka Koloušková – 579 points (9th place)
 Dagmar Bílková – 571 points (24th place)

Sport pistol women
 Jindřiška Šimková – 575 points (14th place)
 Regina Kodýmová – 573 points (21st place)

Swimming

Men's 100m Backstroke
 Rastislav Bizub – heat: 57.57 s (did not advance, 24th place)
 Marcel Blažo – heat: 57.61 s (did not advance, 26th place)

Men's 200m Backstroke
 Marcel Blažo – heat: 2:02.81 (did not advance, 19th place)
 Rastislav bizub – heat: 2:03.30 (did not advance, 23rd place)

Men's 100m Breaststroke
 Radek beinhauer – heat: 1:04.88 (did not advance, 32nd place)

Men's 200m Breaststroke
 Radek beinhauer – B-final: 2:16.07 (13th place)

Women's 50m Freestyle
 Martina Moravcová – heat: 26.92 s (did not advance, 29th place)

Women's 100m Freestyle
 Martina Moravcová – heat: 57.19 s (did not advance, 18th place)

Women's 400m Freestyle
 Olga Šplíchalová – heat: 4:15.43,  B-final: 4:16.41 (14th place)
 Hana Černá – heat: 4:19.87, B-final, B-final: 4:21.50 (16th place)

Women's 800m Freestyle
 Olga Šplíchalová – final: 8:37.66 (6th place)

Women's 100m Backstroke
 Helena Straková – heat: 1:05.38 (did not advance, 30th place)
 Martina Moravcová – heat: 1:05.73 (did not advance, 31st place)

Women's 200m Backstroke
 Helena Straková – heat: 2:18.44 (did not advance, 30th place)

Women's 100m Breaststroke
 Lenka Maňhalová – heat: 1:13.96 (did not advance, 29th place)

Women's 100m Butterfly
 Martina Moravcová – heat: 1:02.11 (did not advance, 19th place)

Women's 200m Individual Medley
 Hana Černá – heat: 2:19.93 (did not advance, 22nd place)
 Lenka Manhalová – heat: 2:20.52 (did not advance, 24th place)

Women's 400m Individual Medley
 Hana Černá – B-final: 4:50.30 (14th place)

Synchronized swimming

One synchronized swimmer represented Czechoslovakia in 1992.

Women's solo
 Lucie Svrčinová

Table tennis

Men's singles
 Petr Korbel – preliminary group: 2 wins, 1 loss (did not advance)
 Roland Vími – preliminary group: 1 win, 2 losses (did not advance)
 Tomáš Jančí – preliminary group: 3 losses (did not advance)

Women's singles
 Marie Hrachová – 4th place
 preliminary group: 3 wins
 round of 16: lost to Chai Po Wa HKG 0-3

Women's doubles
 Marie Hrachová, Jaroslava Mihočková – preliminary group: 2 wins, 1 loss (did not advance)

Tennis

Men

Women

Water polo

Men's Team Competition
Preliminary round (group A)
 Lost to Unified Team (6-10)
 Lost to United States (3-9)
 Lost to Germany (9-15)
 Lost to France (6-14)
 Lost to Australia (9-15)
Classification Matches
 Lost to the Netherlands (8-9)
 Lost to Greece (8-10) → 12th place
Team Roster
 Roman Bacik
 Eduard Baluch 
 Vidor Borsig 
 Tomas Bundschuh 
 Pavol Dinzik 
 Peter Hornak 
 Julius Izdinsky 
 Miroslav Janich
 Stefan Kmeto 
 Roman Polacik 
 Ladislav Vidumansky
 Petr Veszelits

Weightlifting

Wrestling

Greco-Roman
62 kg
 Jindřich Vavrla – eliminated in 2nd round

74 kg
 Jaroslav zeman – 7th place

82 kg
 Pavel frinta – 8th place

Freestyle
74 kg
 Milan Revický – eliminated in 3rd round

82 kg
 Jozef Lohyňa – 5th place

90 kg
 Josef palatinus – eliminated in 3rd round

82 kg
 Juraj Štech – eliminated in 2nd round

References

Nations at the 1992 Summer Olympics
1992
Summer Olympics